Geoffrey Pomeroy Dennis (20 January 1892 – 15 May 1963) was an English diplomat and writer who won the Hawthornden Prize in 1930 for The End of the World. His Bloody Mary's (1934) is an autobiographical account of a young schoolboy in an English public school around the turn of the century.

Dennis served on the staff of the League of Nations in Geneva.

In 1937 he was sued for libel by Winston Churchill for insulting the future wife of Edward VIII, Wallis Simpson.

Works 
 Mary Lee, 1922
 Harvest in Poland, 1925, revised edition 1931
 Declaration of Love, 1927
 The End of the World, 1930
 Sale by Auction (The Red Room in the U.S.), 1932
 Bloody Mary's, 1934
 The Devil and X Y Z, 1937 (as by Barum Browne, with Hilary Saint George Saunders)
 Coronation Commentary, 1937
 Till Seven, 1957

References

1892 births
1963 deaths
20th-century English writers
British expatriates in Switzerland